KXLU (88.9 FM) is a radio station broadcasting out of Loyola Marymount University in southwest Los Angeles, California. It was first on the air in 1957, and in 2007, celebrated its 50th anniversary. It is a non-commercial college radio station that plays many styles of music broadly classified under rock, specialty, fine arts, alternative music and Latin jazz. KXLU has a small, cult following among music fans in the general Los Ángeles metropolitan area. The station's rock programming runs between 2am and 6pm on weekdays and the hosts during this time are predominantly college students. Specialty shows include "Stray Pop" hosted by Stella, "Music For Nimrods" hosted by Reverend Dan, "She Rocks" hosted by McAllister, Biancadonk and Cass Monster, "In a Dream" hosted by Mystic Pete, "The Bomb Shelter" hosted by Uncle Tim, "Livation" hosted by Robert Douglas and Hilary Russell, "The Molotov Cocktail Hour" hosted by Cyrano & Señor Amor, "The Windmills of Your Mind" hosted by Taylor 2000, "Neuz Pollution" hosted by Chris Candy and Maki, "Demolisten" hosted by Fred and Sean Carnage, and "A Fistful Of Vinyl" hosted by Alec & John, "Center Stage" hosted by Mark Gordon, among other programs. There is also a public affairs program called "Echo in the Sense". Their weekend Latin jazz programming "Alma del Barrio" has been on the air since 1973.

The current General Manager is Nate Rynaski, the current Program Director is Lilly McCarty, and the current Music Director is Kees Wilcox.

KXLU Demolisten history

Demolisten has been a weekly show on KXLU since 1984, which only plays demos from unsigned acts. It is credited with introducing numerous acts to the public.

The show began in 1984 when "DJ Agent Ava" took a couple reel-to-reel tapes of Jane's Addiction and Faith No More, and decided to start a radio show of nothing but demo tapes. Once word got out about the show, she soon acquired demos from Red Hot Chili Peppers, Guns N' Roses, The Jesus and Mary Chain and others.

Perry Farrell, in the book Whores: An Oral Biography of Perry Farrell and Jane's Addiction said, "The cool thing about KXLU's Demolisten show was if you were a local band you could just call in, request your song and if you went down there, they would interview you... I was listening to KXLU all day long because that's where all the good music was. The rest of the world was out of it."

The early 1990s DJs featured Fred Kiko, Chad, and Tony Kiewel. They've often been credited with the discovery of Beck, who donated a track to the Demolisten: Volume 2 CD, and also played music by Jimmy Tamborello (The Postal Service, Dntel), who was a friend and fellow KXLU DJ at the time.

Tony Kiewel left the show for an A&R position at Sub Pop Records in 2000.

The early 2000s continued to feature Fred, with Devin Valdesuso and Doug Jones (label owner of Kittridge Records).

Hosts have included the International Voice of Reason AKA IVOR, and others.

In 2002, Fred was joined by co-host Octavius Poirier (former guitarist for Artichoke and Chewing Foil). Audio archives of KXLU Demolisten have been saved online since 2003.

In 2011 and 2012, Demolisten was hosted by Fred and Sean Carnage of Sean Carnage Monday Nights @ Pehrspace in Historic Filipino Town in Echo Park.

Since 2013, Fred has been hosting the show on his own. In 2013, Demolisten started hosting live shows at Time Warp Music in Mar Vista.

Interviews and reviews
The members of KXLU Demolisten were on a TV show in Canada where they were interviewed by Laurie Pike circa 1995. There is a writeup of the show in LA Weekly Feb. 24, 1998. They were nominated as best radio show in Los Ángeles by the LA Weekly: published June 2, 1999. They were mentioned in Slate Magazine as an influence on the author's music taste on Nov. 29, 2004. Also mentioned in The Los Ángeles Alternative, an independent newspaper, when KXLU won one of the top 5 radio stations in the city in the people's choice awards: Published June 30, 2006. Demolisten was featured in an independent film, Destroy the Rocker, about the Los Ángeles music scene.

References

External links
 

 
 KXLU Demolisten
 Stray Pop with Stella
 Music For Nimrods with Reverend Dan
 Livation with Robert Douglas & Hilary Russell
 A Fistful Of Vinyl with Alec & John on KXLU 88.9 FM
 KXLU's page on StylusCity
 Molotov Cocktail Hour
 Whores: An Oral Biography of Perry Farrell and Jane's Addiction by Brendan Mullen
 LA Weekly, Feb 1998
 LA Alternative, June 2006
 LA Weekly, 1999
 Slate Magazine, June 1999
 Beck: The Art of Mutation, by Nevin Martell; published Simon and Schuster, 2001
 Destroy the Rocker, Film by Jason Muller; 2007
 Daily Bruin Article, Nov 1997
 LA Weekly, 2009

1957 establishments in California
XLU
Loyola Marymount University
Radio stations established in 1957
XLU